The General Education Board was a private organization which was used primarily to support higher education and medical schools in the United States, and to help rural white and black schools in the South, as well as modernize farming practices in the South. It helped eradicate hookworm and created the county agent system in American agriculture, linking research as state agricultural experiment stations with actual practices in the field.

The Board was created in 1902 after John D. Rockefeller donated an initial $1,000,000 dollars to its cause. The Rockefeller family would eventually give over $180 million to fund the General Education Board. Prominent member Frederick Taylor Gates envisioned "The Country School of To-Morrow," wherein "young and old will be taught in practicable ways how to make rural life beautiful, intelligent, fruitful, re-creative, healthful, and joyous." By 1934 the Board was making grants of $5.5 million a year. It spent nearly all its money by 1950 and closed in 1964.

History
The formation of the General Education Board began in early 1902. On January 15, 1902, two months after the Southern Education Board was founded, a small group of men gathered at the home of banker Morris K. Jessup to discuss education. This meeting included John D. Rockefeller Jr., Robert Curtis Ogden, George Foster Peabody, Jabez L. M. Curry, William H Baldwin Jr., and Wallace Buttrick. That day, the men discussed raising educational standards, and widening educational opportunities.

On February 27, 1902, a second meeting was held at John D. Rockefeller Jr.'s home. This meeting was attended by the guests of the original meeting but also included Daniel Coit Gilman, Albert Shaw, Walter Hines Page, and Edward Morse Shepard. At the climax of the meeting, it was announced that John D. Rockefeller Sr. would give $1,000,000 for the inauguration of an educational program. Thus, the General Education Board was born.

The General Education Board was incorporated by an Act of Congress that took place on January 12, 1903. Their main object being "the promotion of education within the United States of America, without distinction of race, sex, or creed" 

The original members of the General Education Board were: William H. Baldwin Jr., Jabez L.M. Curry, Frederick T. Gates, Daniel C. Gilman, Morris K. Jesup, Robert C. Ogden, Walter Hines Page, George Foster Peabody, and Albert Shaw.

Upon evidence that this work would be effectively carried out, and Wallace Buttrick’s 1905 observation that “the fundamental problem of the South is the recovery of the fertility of the soil,” the program grew further.  on 30 June 1905 he made an additional gift of $10,000,000 and in 1907 a further sum of $32,000,000.

Rockefeller eventually gave it $180 million, which was used primarily to support higher education and medical schools in the United States and to improve farming practices in the South. It helped eradicate hookworm and created the county agent system in American agriculture, linking research at state agricultural experiment stations with actual practices in the field. By 1934 it was making grants of $5.5 million a year. It spent nearly all its money by 1950 and ceased operating as a separate entity in 1960, when its programs were subsumed into the Rockefeller Foundation.

Programs
It had four main programs:

1. The promotion of practical farming in the southern states.  Through the Department of Agriculture the board had made accumulative annual appropriations amounting in by 1912-1913 to $673,750 for the purpose of promoting agriculture by the establishment of demonstration farms under the direction of Dr. Seaman A. Knapp. About 236 men were employed in supervising such farms. In 1906 the General Education Board contributed $7,000, and due to the increased success of the programs in reaching the distant southern farming communities, G.E.B. contributions grew each year. In addition to promoting demonstration farms, instructors for the education of farmers were also furnished. The work of the Board also influenced the practical teaching of agriculture in the schools of the southern United States.

2. The establishment of public high schools in the southern states. Upon the General Education Board's foundation in 1902, it was stated that the immediate prerogative of the organization was to "devote itself to studying and aiding to promote the educational needs of the people of our southern states." For this purpose, the board appropriated for state universities or state departments of education in the South sums to pay for the salaries of high school representatives to travel throughout their states and stimulate public sentiment in favor of high schools.  As a result of this work, 912 high schools had been established in 11 southern states by 1914.

3. The promotion of institutions of higher learning.  By 1914 the board had made conditional appropriations to the amount of $8,817,500, gifts towards an approximate total of $41,020,500.  This money was expended throughout the United States.

4. Schools for Negroes.  By 1914, the board had made contributions, amounting to $620,105, to schools for Negroes, mainly those for the training of teachers.  Anna T. Jeanes had contributed $1,000,000 for that purpose.

The work of the General Education Board had a social side as well. “Corn” and educative clubs to study house management, poultry, preservation of fruit and other subjects directly related with agricultural life were encouraged in various ways, more especially in connection with the girl's clubs. Other clubs of a purely social nature were organized for the promotion of more social life in farming communities.

The investigations which preceded the gifts of the Board were perhaps of as great importance to the development of education in the United States as the gifts themselves. The Board consisted of 17 members and maintained headquarters in New York City. In 1920 the president was Wallace Buttrick, and the secretary, Abraham Flexner.

Implications 
The General Education Board emphasized the need for real world applicational skills. Two areas which the General Education Board highlighted was Demonstrative Farming as well as Industrial Education. Wallace Buttrick an influential member in the development of the General Education Board highlighted that, "the fundamental problem of the South is the recovery of the fertility of the soil.” For this reason as well,  the lack of literacy and overall knowledge on modern farming techniques the General Education Board implemented interactive learning techniques rather than "how-to manuals." Because these demonstrations were so effective at informing white and black farmers at the time, the General Education Board invested in committees which were more willing to build/sponsor programs which provided vocational and nonvocational information. Education in a time of racial discrimination became vehicles for African American empowerment. Because of the discriminatory philosophy of the time, African Americans were granted limited knowledge in the realm of industrial training. In most cases information ranged from basic skills to learning strong working habits, which in most cases was no where close to the information needed to obtain higher learning. However, because of this learning African Americans were able to secure better jobs, teach others industrial learning, and receive higher training to pursue increase educations.

Future 
The work done by the General Education Board paved the way for philanthropic foundations which provided financial grants throughout the American south. These funds were distributed in areas to stimulate the growth of educational practices and bring men and women from all over the country to "promote enlightened and sympathetic understanding of the South’s educational problems following the Reconstruction period."

Peabody Fund (1867)

Slater Fund (1882)

Anna T. Jeanes Foundation (1907)'

Jeanes Teachers

Julius Rosenwald Fund (1917)

Phelps-Stokes Fund

Philosophy
"In our dream, we have limitless resources and the people yield themselves with perfect docility to our molding hand. The present educational conventions fade from their minds; and, unhampered by tradition, we work our own good will upon a grateful and responsive rural folk. We shall not try to make these people or any of their children into philosophers or men of learning, or men of science. We have not to raise up from among them authors, editors, poets or men of letters. We shall not search for embryo great artists, painters, musicians nor lawyers, doctors, preachers, politicians, statesmen, of whom we have an ample supply…The task we set before ourselves is very simple as well as a very beautiful one, to train these people as we find them to a perfectly ideal life just where they are… So we will organize our children into a little community and teach them to do in a perfect way the things their fathers and mothers are doing in an imperfect way, in the homes, in the shops and on the farm." - General Education Board, Occasional Papers, No. 1 "The country school of to-morrow" (General Education Board, New York, 1913) p. 6.

See also
 Philanthropy in the United States
Rockefeller family
Rockefeller Foundation
John D. Rockefeller
John D. Rockefeller, Jr.

References

Further reading
 Fleming, Louise E. and Rita S. Saslaw. "Rockefeller and General Education Board Influences on Vocational ism in Education, 1880-1925" (1992) online
Fosdick, Raymond Blaine. Adventures in Giving: The Story of the General Education Board, (1962).
Harr, John Ensor, and Peter J. Johnson. The Rockefeller Century: Three Generations of America's Greatest Family, (1988).
 General Education Board. The General Education Board: An Account of Its Activities, 1902-1914. (1915) online free
 General Education Board. Annual Report Of The General Education Board 1934-1935 (1936) online free

External links
 Activities in Tennessee
 Activities in 1939 1939: General Education Board - Archive Article - MSN Encarta  (Archived 2009-10-31)
 "Without Distinction of Race, Sex, or Creed": The General Education Board, 1903-1964 (Rockefeller Archive Center)
  General Education Board Archives, (1901-1964) - 1967 Southern Secondary and Elementary Education (Rockefeller Archive Center)
https://web.archive.org/web/20070323030240/http://www.thememoryhole.org/edu/school-mission.htm

Institutions founded by the Rockefeller family
Rockefeller Foundation
Education in the United States
Educational foundations in the United States
1902 establishments in the United States